The Journal of Business Ethics Education is a peer-reviewed academic journal that examines the particular challenges facing business ethics educators. It publishes articles, case studies, and reviews intended to help instructors do a better job in the classroom. Established in 2004, the journal is edited by John Hooker at Carnegie Mellon University, and published by NeilsonJournals Publishing in print and electronic formats. The journal is also available online from the Philosophy Documentation Center.

Notable contributors
Norman E. Bowie
 Joanne B. Ciulla
 William C. Frederick
 Richard T. De George
 Joseph DesJardins
 Georges Enderle
 Edwin M. Hartmann
 Lori V. Ryan

See also 
 List of philosophy journals

External links 
 
 JBEEEditorial Board
 NeilsonJournals Publishing
 Online access for the Society for Business Ethics

Annual journals
Business ethics
Education journals
English-language journals
Publications established in 2004
Ethics journals
Philosophy Documentation Center academic journals